Patricia Akhimie is an associate professor Rutgers University who is known for her work on early modern women's travel writing and Shakespearean writing.

Education and career 
Akhimie has a B.A. from Princeton University (2000), an M.F.A. from the University of Michigan (2002), an M.A. (2003) and a Ph.D.(2011) from Columbia University. Akhimie has served as the scholar-in-residence for the St. Louis Shakespeare Festival. As of 2022, she is an associate professor at Rutgers University in the departments of English, women's and gender studies, and she was named director of the Folger Institute in November 2022.

Selected publications 
Her first book, Shakespeare and the Cultivation of Difference: Race, Conduct, and the Early Modern World was published by Routledge in 2018. Her co-edited collection (with Bernadette Andrea), Travel and Travail: Early Modern Women, English Drama, and the Wider World, was published by the University of Nebraska Press in 2019.

References 

Living people
Princeton University alumni
University of Michigan alumni
Columbia University alumni
Rutgers University faculty
Shakespearean scholars
Year of birth missing (living people)